Ogdensburg is a city in St. Lawrence County, New York, United States. The population was 10,436 at the 2019 census. In the late 18th century, European-American settlers named the community after American land owner and developer Samuel Ogden.  The city is at the northern border of New York at the mouth of the Oswegatchie River on the south bank of the St. Lawrence River. The only formally designated city in the county, it is located between Massena, New York to the east and Brockville, Ontario to the west.

The port of Ogdensburg is the only U.S. port on the St. Lawrence Seaway. The Ogdensburg–Prescott International Bridge, northeast of the city, links the United States and Canada, with a direct highway from Prescott to Ottawa, the capital of Canada.

History
This was ancient territory for thousands of years of indigenous peoples of varying cultures. By 1000 CE, Iroquoian-speaking people were settling along the St. Lawrence River and practicing agriculture, as well as hunting and fishing. The earliest French explorers recorded Stadacona and Hochelaga as  villages of these people in the early 16th century. By the end of the century, later explorers found the villages utterly abandoned with no signs of life.

Since the 1950s, historians, linguists, and archeologists have found evidence of a distinct people, now called the St. Lawrence Iroquoians, who inhabited the areas along the St. Lawrence River from before 1300 until the late 16th century.  They spoke Laurentian and were a group distinct from the later historical Five Nations of the Iroquois Haudenosaunee who emerged along the southern edge of the Great Lakes and were based in present-day New York and Pennsylvania. By the late 16th century, the St. Lawrence Iroquoians had disappeared from the St. Lawrence Valley, probably due to warfare by the Mohawk of the Haudenosaunee over the fur trade.

By the time of later French contact, for instance in the early 17th century with Samuel de Champlain, the Five Nations of the Haudenosaunee: Mohawk, Onondaga, Oneida, Cayuga, and Seneca, were allied in the Iroquois Confederacy, based in present-day New York. Onondaga settlements extended up along the south shore of Lake Ontario. Both the Huron and Mohawk used the St. Lawrence Valley for hunting grounds and as a path for war parties.

The earliest European settlement in the area was a French mission, built by Abbé Picquet in 1749 as part of the colony of New France in North America. Located near the mouth of the Fleuve Oswegache (Oswegatchie River), he named it Fort de La Présentation (Fort of the Presentation). The mission attracted Native Americans for the fur trade, many of whom settled in the village and converted to Catholicism. Mostly Onondaga, the converted Iroquois at the mission became known to the French as Oswegatchie after their transliterated name for the river.

By 1755, there were 3,000 Iroquois living at the mission settlement. By comparison, Montreal had only 4,000 residents at the time. It was bordered by a mission village, Kahnewake, located on the south side of the St. Lawrence River.

The Oswegatchie became known as one of the Seven Nations of Canada. The residents were hostile to the encroachments of British colonists on their territory. During the 1750s and the French and Indian War, warriors from this fort allied with French officers in attacking British colonists in the Champlain, Mohawk and Ohio valleys.

The city is near the site of the 1760 Battle of the Thousand Islands between British and French forces during the Seven Years' War (known in the later United States as the French and Indian War.) Both sides made use of Indian allies. After the British victory in the war, France ceded its land in Canada and east of the Mississippi to England.

The English renamed this installation as Fort Oswegatchie, after the native name for the river (and as the English transliterated the French into English phonetic spelling). As with the other mission settlements, the British did not disturb the relationship of the Oswegatchie, as they called the native people, and their Catholic priests. The British considered this community part of Lower Canada or Quebec province. The village remained under British rule until 1796 following the American Revolutionary War. With the northern border redefined by Jay's Treaty, the settlement became part of United States territory, which extended to the south shore of the St. Lawrence River in this area up to Cornwall, Ontario where the border followed the 45th parallel to the east along a latitude line.

The first settlers under an American flag arrived that year in 1796. American settlers essentially drove the Oswegatchie, former British allies, out of the area; many went to Akwesasne or other Mohawk reserves in Canada.

New American residents named the village Ogdensburgh after Samuel Ogden, an early landowner. The community developed around this early settlement, which was designated the county seat from 1802 to 1828. During the War of 1812, the city was captured by British forces to end the partial blockade on the St. Lawrence River and harassment that had been conducted from the community. In the absence of US troops, the local merchants restored an extensive trade with Canadian towns across the river.

The community was incorporated as a village in 1817. Unlike Plattsburgh, it removed the "h" in the spelling of its name. The locale was chartered as the City of Ogdensburg in 1868. It is located between Brockville, Ontario to the west and Massena, New York to the east.

In 1940 the town was the site of the signing of the Ogdensburg Agreement between Canadian Prime Minister Mackenzie King and United States President Franklin D. Roosevelt. This renewed the ties between the two countries after the 1939 outbreak of World War II in Europe. The celebrated German POW Franz von Werra escaped from Canada to Ogdensburg in a rowboat.

Ogdensburg hosted various minor league baseball teams between 1900 and 1951. Ogdensburg (1900–1901), the Ogdensburg Colts (1936–1939), Ottawa-Ogdensburg Senators (1940) and Ogdensburg Maples (1946–1951) played as members of the Northern New York League (1900–1901), Canadian–American League (1936–1940) and Border League (1946–1951). Ogdensburg was an affiliate of the Philadelphia Phillies (1940) and New York Giants (1948). Teams played at Winter Park, known today as Father Martin Park.

Historic resources
The Library Park Historic District, Judge John Fine House, Acker and Evans Law Office, New York State Armory, Ogdensburg Harbor Light, Oswegatchie Pumping Station, Ogdensburg Armory, Robert C. McEwen United States Custom House, United States Post Office, and Fort de La Présentation Site are listed on the National Register of Historic Places.

Demographics

As of the census of 2000, there were 12,364 people, 4,181 households, and 2,583 families residing in the city. The population density was 2,440.0 people per square mile (941.6/km2). There were 4,531 housing units at an average density of 894.2 per square mile (345.1/km2). The racial makeup of the city was 85.05% White, 9.92% African American, 0.80% Native American, 0.69% Asian, 0.06% Pacific Islander, 2.81% from other races, and 0.67% from two or more races. Hispanic or Latino of any race were 6.22% of the population.

There were 4,181 households, out of which 31.1% had children under the age of 18 living with them, 41.5% were married couples living together, 15.1% had a female householder with no husband present, and 38.2% were non-families. 32.3% of all households were made up of individuals, and 14.2% had someone living alone who was 65 years of age or older. The average household size was 2.39 and the average family size was 2.98.

In the city, the population was spread out, with 21.3% under the age of 18, 9.5% from 18 to 24, 35.3% from 25 to 44, 21.3% from 45 to 64, and 12.4% who were 65 years of age or older. The median age was 36 years. For every 100 females, there were 127.6 males. For every 100 females age 18 and over, there were 134.6 males.

The median income for a household in the city was $27,954, and the median income for a family was $36,236. Males had a median income of $32,358 versus $21,485 for females. The per capita income for the city was $12,650. About 14.2% of families and 18.3% of the population were below the poverty line, including 23.3% of those under age 18 and 13.6% of those age 65 or over.

Education
The following schools are in the city of Ogdensburg:
Ogdensburg Free Academy
John F. Kennedy Elementary
Grant C. Madill Elementary

Resources
Ogdensburg is home to the St. Lawrence Psychiatric Center, a mental health service provider offering both inpatient and outpatient services. The SLPC is part of the New York State Office of Mental Health (OMH) and serves the general public.

A private educational institution, Mater Dei College, now closed, was formerly located in Ogdensburg. After Mater Dei College closed, its campus was occupied from 2001 to 2009 by Academy at Ivy Ridge. The privately operated boarding school enrolled kids aged 11–18 with behavioral issues. 
The Ogdensburg Public Library provides services including, but not limited to, free internet services, (wi-fi and computers that can be borrowed), as well as seven-day DVD and Blu-ray rentals, books, audiobooks and much more. There are services provided for teens, children and adults.

The city is the site of the Frederic Remington Art Museum. The downtown museum is housed in the former family mansion of local industrialist David Parish on Washington Street. While the house was always called the Parish Mansion, Eva Remington lived there as a widow after the death of her husband Frederic Remington. He was notable for his paintings of the American West. The collection of Remington art and memorabilia is based on items from the estates of Eva Remington and her sister Emma.

The Fort La Presentation Association has been organized to reconstruct and operate the mission fort as a living history museum. They intend to use it as a basis for education and heritage tourism, as well as an appreciation for the diverse history and peoples of the area.

Ogdensburg is the site of two correctional facilities: Riverview and Ogdensburg. Run by the New York State Department of Correctional Services, the facilities provide jobs for local residents. One is located on the grounds of the former St. Lawrence Psychiatric Center. The other was built directly across New York State Route 37.

Ogdensburg has become a cross-border shopping by mail center due to Canadians ordering goods on the internet and having them delivered to package receiving companies in Ogdensburg, and then driving to Ogdensburg to bring the items into Canada themselves. The UPS Store in Ogdensburg has been providing this service to Canadians for the last decade. Often this is due to U.S. companies offering web shopping but not shipping to Canada or charging a much higher price for items (or shipping charges) being sent to Canada. Businesses also warehouse their materials in Ogdensburg for shipping to locations in the U.S. and overseas.

Transportation
Beginning in the mid-19th century, Ogdensburg expanded on its role as a port city on the St. Lawrence River, becoming an important trading city and station as railroads were developed in northern New York and southeastern Canada. The Ogdensburg & Lake Champlain Railroad (later Rutland Railroad) (1849), Rome, Watertown & Ogdensburg Railroad (1853) and Portland & Ogdensburg Railway (never completed), all constructed lines through the area connecting the historic towns. In time, the RW&O was bought out by the New York Central Railroad. That passenger rail service ended in 1961.

The Ogdensburg-Prescott International Bridge was built in 1960, connecting Ogdensburg and Johnstown, Ontario.  The roadways are NY 812 and ON 16, the latter a direct route to Ottawa, the capital of Canada. On the United States side, Ogdensburg is not connected directly to the interstate highway system. The border crossing has unused capacity on the bridge; although it has considerable truck traffic, volume is about one-tenth of that on the Thousand Islands Bridge.

Ogdensburg International Airport is located south of the city.

Events

 The Ogdensburg Boys & Girls Club Expo is held on the 3rd weekend in March, and is one of the main fundraisers for that organization.
 The last full week in July is the occasion of the annual Ogdensburg International Seaway Festival.  Among the events of the week are the Remington Canoe Race, a local Battle of the High School Bands competition, craft shows, a classic car show, and many other events.  The festival ends with a fireworks show on Friday night and a parade on Saturday morning.

Notable people

Rick Carlisle, NBA head coach and former professional basketball player
Lawrence S Churchill, colonel U. S. Army Air Corp
Sally James Farnham, American sculptor
John Fine, United States Representative
Charlie Gogolak, NFL placekicker, born in Hungary, younger brother of Pete Gogolak
Pete Gogolak, AFL and NFL placekicker, first soccer-style kicker in pro football, born in Hungary
Jimmy Howard, professional hockey goaltender for the Detroit Red Wings, member of the 2014 USA Olympic ice hockey team.
Margaret Jacobs, artist
Preston King, Collector of the Port of New York
James A. Lindsay, mathematician, author, and cultural critic
George R. Malby, former U.S. Congressman
Robert C. McEwen, United States Representative
John Mosher, writer and film critic
Audrey Munson, artist's model and film actress
Robert Odlum, first person to jump off the Brooklyn Bridge
Henry R. Paige, major general in the Marine Corps
Frederic Remington, 19th and 20th-century American artist
Brenda Romero, game designer and writer
Mark Valley, actor and comedian
Joseph Vilas, Wisconsin state senator and businessman
M. Emmet Walsh, actor

Radio

 WPAC-FM PAC 98.7
 WVLF-FM Mix 96.1
 WRCD-FM 101.5 The Fox

References

External links

 City of Ogdensburg, NY webpage
  Information and links
  Ogdensburg information
  Rome, Watertown & Ogdensburg Railroad
  Ogdensburg Historical Map
  Photos showing some of the unused buildings of the St. Lawrence State Hospital, built in 1890
 Ogdensburg Public Library
 Ogdensburg City School District

Cities in New York (state)
Cities in St. Lawrence County, New York
New York (state) populated places on the Saint Lawrence River
French and Indian War
Catholic missions of New France